Hungerford Newtown is a hamlet in the civil parish of Hungerford, Berkshire, England.

External links

Hamlets in Berkshire
Hungerford